Isolated growth hormone deficiency (IGHD) is a rare congenital disorder characterized by growth hormone deficiency and postnatal growth failure. It is divided into four subtypes that vary in terms of cause and clinical presentation. They include IGHD IA (autosomal recessive, absent GH), IGHD IB (autosomal recessive, diminished GH), IGHD II (autosomal dominant, diminished GH), and IGHD III (X-linked, diminished GH).

References

Growth hormones
Endocrine-related cutaneous conditions
Growth disorders
Pituitary disorders